Richard Charles Challinor Watson  (16 February 1923 – 1 March 1998) was an Anglican clergyman who was the seventh Bishop of Burnley from 1970 to 1988.

Born in Watford, Hertfordshire, he was the son of Francis William Watson,  and his wife, Alice Madelein Collings-Wells. He was educated at Rugby and New College, Oxford and studied for ordination at Westcott House, Cambridge  before a curacy in Stratford, London . After that he was successively: a tutor at Wycliffe Hall, Oxford; Chaplain of Wadham College, Oxford ; Vicar of Hornchurch; and finally, before his ordination to the episcopate, Rural Dean of Havering.

He  married Anna Chavasse, elder daughter of the Bishop of Rochester Christopher Chavasse. He retired to Thame in 1988 and died 10 years later in Bullingdon, Oxfordshire.

References

1923 births
1998 deaths
People educated at Rugby School
Alumni of New College, Oxford
Alumni of Westcott House, Cambridge
Bishops of Burnley
20th-century Church of England bishops